The 116th Division was a military formation of the People's Volunteer Army (Chinese People's Volunteers (CPV) during the Korean War with a standard strength of approximately 10,000 men.

History 
The 116th Division was part of the 39th Army, consisting of the 346th, 347th, and 348th Regiments.

Korean War 
The 116th Division was one of the first CCF divisions to attack the UN forces as they approached the Yalu River. It effectively reduced the 8th Cavalry Regiment of the 1st Cavalry Division to a combat ineffective unit, after inflicting severe losses on them at Unsan. In all, over eight hundred men of the 8th Cavalry were killed or captured—almost one-third of the regiment's strength.

The enemy [Chinese] force that brought tragedy to the 8th Cavalry at Unsan was the CCF’s 116th Division. Elements of the 116th’s 347th Regiment were responsible for the roadblock south of Unsan. Also engaged in the Unsan action was the 115th Division.

Current 
The formation appears to still be active with the 39th Group Army in the Northern Theater Command, as the 116th Mechanised Infantry Division.

The division was involved with the rest of the 39th Army in the Tiananmen Square protests of 1989. On the evening of 3 June, Xu Feng, the division commander, switched to plain clothes and carried out his own reconnaissance of the city. When he returned, he told subordinates "not to look for him" and went into the division's communications vehicle. Thereafter, the division maintained radio silence and did not advance on Beijing, except for the 347th Regiment under Ai Husheng, which complied with orders and went to Tiananmen Square on 4 June. On 5 June, the rest of the division was escorted by other units to the square. Xu Feng was later disciplined for passive resistance.

See also 
 People's Liberation Army at Tiananmen Square protests of 1989

References 

Infantry divisions of the People's Volunteer Army
116
Red Army Divisions of the People's Liberation Army
Military units and formations established in 1948